Snow Maiden may refer to:
Snegurochka, a Russian folklore character, and derived works:
"Snowmaiden", a song on the Amberian Dawn album The Clouds of Northland Thunder
Yuki-onna, a Japanese legendary creature
Rhaphiolepis indica, an ornamental plant

See also
 The Snow Maiden (disambiguation)
 Ice Maiden (disambiguation)